Im Sang-soo (born April 27, 1962) is a South Korean film director and screenwriter. He has twice been invited to compete for the Palme d'Or at the Cannes Film Festival, with The Housemaid in 2010 and The Taste of Money in 2012.

Early life and film career
Im was born in Seoul. He studied sociology at Yonsei University in Seoul before making a move to the Korean Academy of Film Arts (KAFA) in 1989. He began working in film that same year, landing his first job as Park Jeong-won's assistant director on Kuro Arirang (was coincidentally also the first film of actor Choi Min-sik).

Following graduation from KAFA, Im worked as an assistant director under Kim Young-bin on Kim's War (1994). In 1995 Im wrote the screenplay for The Eternal Empire, and also the screenplay A Noteworthy Film, which won him the Creation Prix at the Korean Motion Picture Promotion Scenario Competition.

In 1998 Im landed his first directorial gig. Girls' Night Out, a drama about three women in Korea, caused a controversy upon release due to the frank and sexually driven dialogue and has received mixed, almost polarized, reviews.

Tears, a hard drama about the lives of four runaway teenagers in Seoul, came next. Im spent five months in the Garibong-dong district of Seoul amongst homeless runaway teens before writing the script for the film. This film was shot in 2000 on miniDV to save the budget. To achieve greater realism, Im opted to use non-actors.

2003's Good Lawyer's Wife was Im's first film to reach #1 at the South Korean box office, thanks in large part to the suggestive poster and trailer campaign centered on star Moon So-ri (who was cast after Kim Hye-soo dropped out to pursue a TV career). This film was also screened in the main competition program at the 2003 Venice International Film Festival.

Next in Im's string of controversial films was 2005's President's Last Bang, about the night President Park Chung-hee was assassinated by his KCIA Director. The controversy started before it was released to the public (a press screening had already been held), with President Park's family suing MK Pictures over the film's content. A Korean court ordered the removal of 3 minutes and 50 seconds' worth of documentary footage from the film as it was thought the documentary footage might confuse the public into thinking the film was based on hard facts, which Im admits is not the case.

The Old Garden, Im's fifth film, was released theatrically in fall 2006. It debuted at the 2006 San Sebastián Film Festival. His 2010 film, The Housemaid, competed for the Palme d'Or at the 2010 Cannes Film Festival. In 2012 The Taste of Money competed for the Palme d'Or at the 2012 Cannes Film Festival.

Actress Youn Yuh-jung, a constant collaborator, has noted that "many actors shy away from working with him because he is provocative and daring, but that is how he views the world".

Controversy
All of Im's films have been controversial, but his film The President's Last Bang, centered on the assassination of Park Chung-hee, has been the most controversial due to its negative portrayal of the Korean president. In 2005 a South Korean court ordered the removal of 3 minutes and 50 seconds of the film before it could be shown to the public. The offending scenes were made up of documentary footage, part of which showed President Park's funeral.

In August 2006 this ruling was overturned, with the court confirming the "right of free expression concerning the depiction of public historical figures". The court has also ordered MK Pictures, the production company that had financed the film, to pay President Park's family 100 million won (roughly $105,000 USD).

The film has been released in South Korea and America on DVD in 2005. Both discs contain a plain black screen where the footage was removed. There has been no release date set for a DVD containing the cut footage. However, the British and French releases contain the fully uncut version.

Filmography

Feature films

Short films

Awards and nominations
A Noteworthy Film
1995, Creation Prix at the Korean Motion Picture Promotion Scenario Competition

Tears 
2000, FIPRESCI Prize – Special Mention (For its ability to put real life on screen, and its extraordinary performances) at the Pusan International Film Festival
2001, Nominated for Best International Feature Film at the Torino International Festival of Young Cinema
2001, Nominated for the Bronze Horse at the Stockholm Film Festival

A Good Lawyer's Wife
2003, Best Actress (Moon So-ri) at the Stockholm Film Festival
2003, Best Cinematography (Kim Woo-hyung) at the Stockholm Film Festival
2003, Silver Spur Prize at the Flanders International Film Festival
2003, Nominated for the Golden Lion at the Venice International Film Festival
2004, Lotus Prize at the Deauville Asian Film Festival
2004, Best Actress (Moon So-ri) at the Grand Bell Awards, South Korea

The President's Last Bang 
2005, Lino Brocka Award at the Cinemanila International Film Festival
2005, Best Film at the Baeksang Arts Awards, South Korea
2005, Nominated for Best Director at the Baeksang Arts Awards, South Korea
2005, Nominated for Best Screenplay at the Baeksang Arts Awards, South Korea
2005, Best Director at the Director's Cut Awards, South Korea

The Old Garden 
2008, Nominated for Best Screenwriter at the Asian Film Awards

See also
List of South Korean film directors
 Cinema of Korea

References

External links 

Im Sang-soo at Naver movie 

1962 births
Living people
People from Seoul
South Korean film directors